Eleventh Street is a Metromover station in the Park West neighborhood of Downtown, Miami, Florida.

This station, opened May 26, 1994, is located at the intersection of Northeast Second Avenue and 11th Street, just southeast of the Arts & Entertainment District.

Station layout

Places of interest
Museum Park
Marquis Tower
Marinablue
Ten Museum Park
Venture Hive

External links
 MDT – Metromover Stations
 entrance from Google Maps Street View

Metromover stations
Railway stations in the United States opened in 1994
1994 establishments in Florida
Omni Loop